= Maxim Kapiturov =

Russian ice hockey player

- Born: October 25, 1995 (age 30) Chelyabinsk, Russia
- Height: 6 ft 1 in (185 cm)
- Weight: 185 lb (84 kg; 13 st 3 lb)
- Position: Forward
- Shoots: Left
- VHL team Former teams: HC Lada Togliatti; Amur Khabarovsk
- Playing career: 2012–present

Maxim Kapiturov (Russian: Максим Капитуров; born October 25, 1995) is a Russia professional ice hockey forward playing with HC Lada Togliatti of the Supreme Hockey League (VHL).

Kapiturov made his Kontinental Hockey League debut playing with Amur Khabarovsk during the 2019–20 season.
